Hower is a surname. Notable people with the name include:

 Ralph M. Hower (1903–1973), American historian
 Jim Hower (1931–2008), Australian rules footballer
 Nancy Hower (born 1966), American actress, director, screenwriter and producer

See also
 Hower-Slote House, located at Lewis Township, Northumberland County, Pennsylvania
 Hauer, surname